Arthur Earl Humphrey (born November 9, 1927) is an American chemical engineer. Humphrey was born in Moscow, Idaho and attended the University of Idaho, the Massachusetts Institute of Technology and Columbia University (PhD 1953 in Chemical Engineering). He has taught at the University of Pennsylvania, Lehigh University and Pennsylvania State University after retiring from Lehigh.

In 1973, he was elected a member of the National Academy of Engineering for contributions in biochemical engineering as researcher, author, and teacher. He received the John Fritz Medal in 1997. 

He served as President of the American Institute of Chemical Engineers from 1990 to 1991. He was the Dean of Engineering and Applied Science from 1972 to 1980 at the University of Pennsylvania and former Provost and Vice President of Lehigh University, serving from 1980 to 1986.

References

Living people
1927 births
Lehigh University faculty
People from Moscow, Idaho
University of Idaho alumni
Massachusetts Institute of Technology alumni
Columbia School of Engineering and Applied Science alumni
American chemical engineers
University of Pennsylvania faculty
Pennsylvania State University faculty